Abid Mahmood (born 15 July 1977) is a Pakistani cricketer who played List A cricket for the Pakistan Television cricket team

References

External links
 

1977 births
Pakistani cricketers
Sui Northern Gas Pipelines Limited cricketers
Living people